Aratozawa Dam is a dam in Kurihara, Miyagi Prefecture, Japan, completed in 1998.

References 

Dams in Miyagi Prefecture
Dams completed in 1998
Kurihara, Miyagi